Ian Desmond Nankervis (born 13 March 1944) is a former Australian rules footballer who played with Carlton in the Victorian Football League (VFL).

Following his departure from Carlton, Nankervis played for Williamstown in the Victorian Football Association. He won the Division 2 Best and Fairest award (now known as the J. Field Medal) in 1968; but, this caused a dispute with the club when he tried to use it as leverage to get a better pay deal, and it resulted in his being dropped from that year's Grand Final team. He later played for Dandenong.

Notes

External links 

Ian Nankervis's playing statistics from The VFA Project
Ian Nankervis's profile at Blueseum

1944 births
Carlton Football Club players
Williamstown Football Club players
Dandenong Football Club players
Australian rules footballers from Victoria (Australia)
Living people